Phytoecia gianassoi is a species of beetle in the family Cerambycidae. It was described by Sama in 2007 and later reclassified to the subgenus Coptosia within the genus Phytoecia.

References

Phytoecia
Beetles described in 2007